Bruno Miguel Leite Basto (born 21 May 1978) is a Portuguese former professional footballer who played as a left back.

After starting professionally with Benfica, he went on to play in France, the Netherlands and Russia.

Club career
Born in Lisbon, Basto was a graduate of hometown S.L. Benfica's youth system, and began playing professionally with its farm team, F.C. Alverca, being recalled for good in January 1998. After some good performances he began an abroad spell that would last six years, four at FC Girondins de Bordeaux, one-and-a-half seasons at Feyenoord and six months at AS Saint-Étienne, with relative success – he only managed to be first-choice for the first.

In the 2001–02 campaign, Basto helped Girondins finish sixth in Ligue 1, with the side also qualifying for the UEFA Cup after winning the domestic league cup, defeating FC Lorient in the final with two goals from countryman Pauleta (3–0). He returned to Portugal in 2006–07, signing with C.D. Nacional; he was played very rarely in Madeira however, and left for Russia's FC Shinnik Yaroslavl in the 2008 January transfer window where he teamed up with compatriot Ricardo Silva, being released in 2009.

In summer 2010, after not being able to find a club in more than one year, Basto retired from football at the age of 32.

References

External links

1978 births
Living people
Footballers from Lisbon
Portuguese footballers
Association football defenders
Primeira Liga players
Liga Portugal 2 players
F.C. Alverca players
S.L. Benfica footballers
C.D. Nacional players
Ligue 1 players
FC Girondins de Bordeaux players
AS Saint-Étienne players
Eredivisie players
Feyenoord players
Russian Premier League players
FC Shinnik Yaroslavl players
Portugal youth international footballers
Portugal under-21 international footballers
Portuguese expatriate footballers
Expatriate footballers in France
Expatriate footballers in the Netherlands
Expatriate footballers in Russia
Portuguese expatriate sportspeople in France
Portuguese expatriate sportspeople in the Netherlands
Portuguese expatriate sportspeople in Russia